San Francisco Mountains National Forest was established as the San Francisco Mountains Forest Reserve by the General Land Office in Arizona on August 17, 1898 with . After the transfer of federal forests to the U.S. Forest Service in 1905, it became a National Forest on March 4, 1907. On July 1, 1908 the entire forest was combined with other lands to create Coconino National Forest and the name was discontinued.

References

External links
 Forest History Society
 Listing of the National Forests of the United States and Their Dates (from the Forest History Society website) Text from Davis, Richard C., ed. Encyclopedia of American Forest and Conservation History. New York: Macmillan Publishing Company for the Forest History Society, 1983. Vol. II, pp. 743–788.
  

Former National Forests of Arizona
Coronado National Forest
1898 establishments in Arizona Territory
Protected areas established in 1898
1908 disestablishments in Arizona Territory
Protected areas disestablished in 1908